The 2004 FIA GT Hockenheim 500 km was the fourth round the 2004 FIA GT Championship season.  It took place at the Hockenheimring, Germany, on May 16, 2004.

Official results
Class winners in bold.  Cars failing to complete 70% of winner's distance marked as Not Classified (NC).

Statistics
 Pole position – #4 Konrad Motorsport – 1:37.132
 Fastest lap – #17 JMB Racing – 1:38.151
 Race winner average speed – 158.800 km/h

References

 
 
 

H
Hockenheim 500